Paraphilia (previously known as sexual perversion and sexual deviation) is the experience of intense sexual arousal to atypical objects, situations, fantasies, behaviors, or individuals. It has also been defined as sexual interest in anything other than a consenting human partner.

There is no scientific consensus for any precise border between unusual sexual interests and paraphilic ones. There is an ongoing debate over which, if any, of the paraphilias should be listed in diagnostic manuals, such as the Diagnostic and Statistical Manual of Mental Disorders (DSM) or the International Classification of Diseases (ICD).

The number and taxonomy of paraphilia is under debate; one source lists as many as 549 types of paraphilia. The DSM-5 has specific listings for eight paraphilic disorders. Several sub-classifications of the paraphilias have been proposed, and some argue that a fully dimensional, spectrum or complaint-oriented approach would better reflect the evidence.

Terminology

History
Many terms have been used to describe atypical sexual interests, and there remains debate regarding technical accuracy and perceptions of stigma. Sexologist John Money popularized the term paraphilia as a non-pejorative designation for unusual sexual interests. Money described paraphilia as "a sexuoerotic embellishment of, or alternative to the official, ideological norm." Psychiatrist Glen Gabbard writes that despite efforts by Stekel and Money, "the term paraphilia remains pejorative in most circumstances."

Coinage of the term paraphilia (paraphilie) has been credited to Friedrich Salomon Krauss in 1903 and it was used with some regularity by Wilhelm Stekel in the 1920s. The term comes from the Greek παρά (para) "beside" and φιλία (-philia) "friendship, love".

In the late 19th century, psychologists and psychiatrists started to categorize various paraphilias as they wanted a more descriptive system than the legal and religious constructs of sodomy and perversion. Before the introduction of the term paraphilia in the DSM-III (1980), the term sexual deviation was used to refer to paraphilias in the first two editions of the manual. In 1981, an article published in American Journal of Psychiatry described paraphilia as "recurrent, intense sexually arousing fantasies, sexual urges, or behaviors generally involving" the following:
 Non-human objects
 The suffering or humiliation of oneself or one's partner
 Children
 Non-consenting persons

Homosexuality and non-heterosexuality
Homosexuality, now widely accepted as a variant of human sexuality, was at one time discussed as a sexual deviation. Sigmund Freud and subsequent psychoanalytic thinkers considered homosexuality and paraphilias to result from psychosexual non-normative relations to the Oedipal complex. As such, the term sexual perversion or the epithet pervert have historically referred to gay men, as well as other non-heterosexuals (people who fall outside the perceived norms of sexual orientation).

By the mid-20th century, mental health practitioners began formalizing "deviant sexuality" classifications into categories. Originally coded as 000-x63, homosexuality was the top of the classification list (Code 302.0) until the American Psychiatric Association removed homosexuality from the DSM in 1973. Martin Kafka writes, "Sexual disorders once considered paraphilias (e.g., homosexuality) are now regarded as variants of normal sexuality."

A 2012 literature study by clinical psychologist James Cantor, when comparing homosexuality with paraphilias, found that both share "the features of onset and course (both homosexuality and paraphilia being life-long), but they appear to differ on sex ratio, fraternal birth order, handedness, IQ and cognitive profile, and neuroanatomy". The research then concluded that the data seemed to suggest paraphilias and homosexuality as two distinct categories, but regarded the conclusion as "quite tentative" given the current limited understanding of paraphilias.

Causes
The causes of paraphilias in people are unclear, but some research points to a possible prenatal neurodevelopmental correlation. A 2008 study analyzing the sexual fantasies of 200 heterosexual men by using the Wilson Sex Fantasy Questionnaire exam determined that males with a pronounced degree of fetish interest had a greater number of older brothers, a high 2D:4D digit ratio (which would indicate excessive prenatal estrogen exposure), and an elevated probability of being left-handed, suggesting that disturbed hemispheric brain lateralization may play a role in paraphilic attractions.

Behavioral explanations propose that paraphilias are conditioned early in life, during an experience that pairs the paraphilic stimulus with intense sexual arousal. Susan Nolen-Hoeksema suggests that, once established, masturbatory fantasies about the stimulus reinforce and broaden the paraphilic arousal.

Diagnosis
There is scientific and political controversy regarding the continued inclusion of sex-related diagnoses such as the paraphilias in the DSM, due to the stigma of being classified as a mental illness.

Some groups, seeking greater understanding and acceptance of sexual diversity, have lobbied for changes to the legal and medical status of unusual sexual interests and practices. Charles Allen Moser, a physician and advocate for sexual minorities, has argued that the diagnoses should be eliminated from diagnostic manuals.

Typical versus atypical interests
Albert Eulenburg (1914) noted a commonality across the paraphilias, using the terminology of his time, "All the forms of sexual perversion...have one thing in common: their roots reach down into the matrix of natural and normal sex life; there they are somehow closely connected with the feelings and expressions of our physiological erotism. They are...hyperbolic intensifications, distortions, monstrous fruits of certain partial and secondary expressions of this erotism which is considered 'normal' or at least within the limits of healthy sex feeling."

The clinical literature contains reports of many paraphilias, only some of which receive their own entries in the diagnostic taxonomies of the American Psychiatric Association or the World Health Organization. There is disagreement regarding which sexual interests should be deemed paraphilic disorders versus normal variants of sexual interest. For example, as of May 2000, per DSM-IV-TR, "Because some cases of Sexual Sadism may not involve harm to a victim (e.g., inflicting humiliation on a consenting partner), the wording for sexual sadism involves a hybrid of the DSM-III-R and DSM-IV wording (i.e., "the person has acted on these urges with a non-consenting person, or the urges, sexual fantasies, or behaviors cause marked distress or interpersonal difficulty")".

The DSM-IV-TR also acknowledges that the diagnosis and classification of paraphilias across cultures or religions "is complicated by the fact that what is considered deviant in one cultural setting may be more acceptable in another setting”. Some argue that cultural relativism is important to consider when discussing paraphilias, because there is wide variance concerning what is sexually acceptable across cultures.

Consensual adult activities and adult entertainment involving sexual roleplay, novel, superficial, or trivial aspects of sexual fetishism, or incorporating the use of sex toys are not necessarily paraphilic. Paraphilial psychopathology is not the same as psychologically normative adult human sexual behaviors, sexual fantasy, and sex play.

Intensity and specificity
Clinicians distinguish between optional, preferred and exclusive paraphilias, although the terminology is not completely standardized. An "optional" paraphilia is an alternative route to sexual arousal. In preferred paraphilias, a person prefers the paraphilia to conventional sexual activities, but also engages in conventional sexual activities.

The literature includes single-case studies of very rare and idiosyncratic paraphilias. These include an adolescent male who had a strong fetishistic interest in the exhaust pipes of cars, a young man with a similar interest in a specific type of car, and a man who had a paraphilic interest in sneezing (both his own and the sneezing of others).

Diagnostic and Statistical Manual of Mental Disorders

DSM-I and DSM-II 
In American psychiatry, prior to the publication of the DSM-I, paraphilias were classified as cases of "psychopathic personality with pathologic sexuality". The DSM-I (1952) included sexual deviation as a personality disorder of sociopathic subtype. The only diagnostic guidance was that sexual deviation should have been "reserved for deviant sexuality which [was] not symptomatic of more extensive syndromes, such as schizophrenic or obsessional reactions". The specifics of the disorder were to be provided by the clinician as a "supplementary term" to the sexual deviation diagnosis; there were no restrictions in the DSM-I on what this supplementary term could be. Researcher Anil Aggrawal writes that the now-obsolete DSM-I listed examples of supplementary terms for pathological behavior to include "homosexuality, transvestism, pedophilia, fetishism, and sexual sadism, including rape, sexual assault, mutilation."

The DSM-II (1968) continued to use the term sexual deviations, but no longer ascribed them under personality disorders, but rather alongside them in a broad category titled "personality disorders and certain other nonpsychotic mental disorders". The types of sexual deviations listed in the DSM-II were: sexual orientation disturbance (homosexuality), fetishism, pedophilia, transvestitism (sic), exhibitionism, voyeurism, sadism, masochism, and "other sexual deviation". No definition or examples were provided for "other sexual deviation", but the general category of sexual deviation was meant to describe the sexual preference of individuals that was "directed primarily toward objects other than people of opposite sex, toward sexual acts not usually associated with coitus, or toward coitus performed under bizarre circumstances, as in necrophilia, pedophilia, sexual sadism, and fetishism." Except for the removal of homosexuality from the DSM-III onwards, this definition provided a general standard that has guided specific definitions of paraphilias in subsequent DSM editions, up to DSM-IV-TR.

DSM-III through DSM-IV 
The term paraphilia was introduced in the DSM-III (1980) as a subset of the new category of "psychosexual disorders."

The DSM-III-R (1987) renamed the broad category to sexual disorders, renamed atypical paraphilia to paraphilia NOS (not otherwise specified), renamed transvestism as transvestic fetishism, added frotteurism, and moved zoophilia to the NOS category. It also provided seven nonexhaustive examples of NOS paraphilias, which besides zoophilia included exhibitionism, necrophilia, partialism, coprophilia, klismaphilia, and urophilia.

The DSM-IV (1994) retained the sexual disorders classification for paraphilias, but added an even broader category, "sexual and gender identity disorders," which includes them. The DSM-IV retained the same types of paraphilias listed in DSM-III-R, including the NOS examples, but introduced some changes to the definitions of some specific types.

DSM-IV-TR
The DSM-IV-TR describes paraphilias as "recurrent, intense sexually arousing fantasies, sexual urges or behaviors generally involving nonhuman objects, the suffering or humiliation of oneself or one's partner, or children or other nonconsenting persons that occur over a period of six months" (criterion A), which "cause clinically significant distress or impairment in social, occupational, or other important areas of functioning" (criterion B). DSM-IV-TR names eight specific paraphilic disorders (exhibitionism, fetishism, frotteurism, pedophilia, sexual masochism, sexual sadism, voyeurism, and transvestic fetishism, plus a residual category, paraphilia—not otherwise specified). Criterion B differs for exhibitionism, frotteurism, and pedophilia to include acting on these urges, and for sadism, acting on these urges with a nonconsenting person. Sexual arousal in association with objects that were designed for sexual purposes is not diagnosable.

Some paraphilias may interfere with the capacity for sexual activity with consenting adult partners.

In the current version of the Diagnostic and Statistical Manual of Mental Disorders (DSM-IV-TR), a paraphilia is not diagnosable as a psychiatric disorder unless it causes distress to the individual or harm to others.

DSM-5 
The DSM-5 adds a distinction between paraphilias and paraphilic disorders, stating that paraphilias do not require or justify psychiatric treatment in themselves, and defining paraphilic disorder as "a paraphilia that is currently causing distress or impairment to the individual or a paraphilia whose satisfaction has entailed personal harm, or risk of harm, to others".

The DSM-5 Paraphilias Subworkgroup reached a "consensus that paraphilias are not ipso facto psychiatric disorders", and proposed "that the DSM-V make a distinction between paraphilias and paraphilic disorders. [...] One would ascertain a paraphilia (according to the nature of the urges, fantasies, or behaviors) but diagnose a paraphilic disorder (on the basis of distress and impairment). In this conception, having a paraphilia would be a necessary but not a sufficient condition for having a paraphilic disorder." The 'Rationale' page of any paraphilia in the electronic DSM-5 draft continues: "This approach leaves intact the distinction between normative and non-normative sexual behavior, which could be important to researchers, but without automatically labeling non-normative sexual behavior as psychopathological. It also eliminates certain logical absurdities in the DSM-IV-TR. In that version, for example, a man cannot be classified as a transvestite—however much he cross-dresses and however sexually exciting that is to him—unless he is unhappy about this activity or impaired by it. This change in viewpoint would be reflected in the diagnostic criteria sets by the addition of the word 'Disorder' to all the paraphilias. Thus, Sexual Sadism would become Sexual Sadism Disorder; Sexual Masochism would become Sexual Masochism Disorder, and so on."

Bioethics professor Alice Dreger interpreted these changes as "a subtle way of saying sexual kinks are basically okay – so okay, the sub-work group doesn't actually bother to define paraphilia. But a paraphilic disorder is defined: that's when an atypical sexual interest causes distress or impairment to the individual or harm to others." Interviewed by Dreger, Ray Blanchard, the Chair of the Paraphilias Sub-Work Group, stated, "We tried to go as far as we could in depathologizing mild and harmless paraphilias, while recognizing that severe paraphilias that distress or impair people or cause them to do harm to others are validly regarded as disorders."

Charles Allen Moser stated that this change is not really substantive, as the DSM-IV already acknowledged a difference between paraphilias and non-pathological but unusual sexual interests, a distinction that is virtually identical to what was being proposed for DSM-5, and it is a distinction that, in practice, has often been ignored. Linguist Andrew Clinton Hinderliter argued that "including some sexual interests—but not others—in the DSM creates a fundamental asymmetry and communicates a negative value judgment against the sexual interests included," and leaves the paraphilias in a situation similar to ego-dystonic homosexuality, which was removed from the DSM because it was no longer recognized as a mental disorder.

The DSM-5 acknowledges that many dozens of paraphilias exist, but only has specific listings for eight that are forensically important and relatively common. These are voyeuristic disorder, exhibitionistic disorder, frotteuristic disorder, sexual masochism disorder, sexual sadism disorder, pedophilic disorder, fetishistic disorder, and transvestic disorder. Other paraphilias can be diagnosed under the Other Specified Paraphilic Disorder or Unspecified Paraphilic Disorder listings, if accompanied by distress or impairment.

International Classification of Diseases

ICD-6,  ICD-7,  ICD-8 
In the ICD-6 (1948) and ICD-7 (1955), a category of “sexual deviation” was listed with “other Pathological personality disorders”. In the ICD-8 (1965), “sexual deviations” were categorized as homosexuality, fetishism, pedophilia, transvestism, exhibitionism, voyeurism, sadism and masochism.

ICD-9 
In the ICD-9 (1975), the category of sexual deviations and disorders was expanded to include transsexualism, sexual dysfunctions, and psychosexual identity disorders. The list contained homosexuality, bestiality, pedophilia, transvestism, exhibitionism, transexualism, Disorders of psychosexual identity, frigidity and impotence, Other sexual deviations and disorders (including fetishism, masochism, and sadism).

ICD-10 
In the ICD-10 (1990), the category "sexual deviations and disorders" was divided into several subcategories. Paraphilias were placed in subcategory of "sexual preference disorders". The list included fetishism, fetishistic transvestism, exhibitionism, voyeurism, pedophilia, sadomasochism and other disorders of sexual preference (including frotteurism, necrophilia, and zoophilia). Homosexuality was removed from the list, but ego-dystonic sexual orientation was still considered a deviation which was placed in subcategory "psychological and behavioural disorders associated with sexual development and orientation".

ICD-11 
In the ICD-11 (2022), "paraphilia" has been replaced with "paraphilic disorder". Any paraphilia and any other arousal pattern by itself no longer constitutes a disorder. To date, the diagnosis must meet criteria of paraphilia and one of the following:

1) a marked distress associated with arousal pattern (but not one that comes from rejection or fear of rejection);

2) the person has acted on the arousal pattern towards unwilling others or others considered as unable to give consent;

3) a serious risk of injury or death.

The list of the paraphilic disorders includes: Exhibitionistic Disorder, Voyeuristic Disorder, Pedophilic Disorder, Coercive Sexual Sadism Disorder, Frotteuristic Disorder, Other Paraphilic Disorder Involving Non-Consenting Individuals, and Other Paraphilic Disorder Involving Solitary Behaviour or Consenting Individuals. As of now, disorders associated with sexual orientation have been removed from the ICD. Gender issues have been removed from the mental health category and have been placed under "Conditions related to sexual health".

Management
Most clinicians and researchers believe that paraphilic sexual interests cannot be altered, although evidence is needed to support this. Instead, the goal of therapy is normally to reduce the person's discomfort with their paraphilia and limit any criminal behavior. Both psychotherapeutic and pharmacological methods are available to these ends.

Cognitive behavioral therapy, at times, can help people with paraphilias develop strategies to avoid acting on their interests. Patients are taught to identify and cope with factors that make acting on their interests more likely, such as stress. It is currently the only form of psychotherapy for paraphilias supported by randomized double-blind trials, as opposed to case studies and consensus of expert opinion.

Medications
Pharmacological treatments can help people control their sexual behaviors, but do not change the content of the paraphilia. They are typically combined with cognitive behavioral therapy for best effect.

SSRIs
Selective serotonin reuptake inhibitors (SSRIs) are used, especially with exhibitionists, non-offending pedophiles, and compulsive masturbators. They are proposed to work by reducing sexual arousal, compulsivity, and depressive symptoms. They have been well received and are considered an important pharmacological treatment of paraphilia.

Antiandrogens
Antiandrogens are used in more severe cases. Similar to physical castration, they work by reducing androgen levels, and have thus been described as chemical castration. The antiandrogen cyproterone acetate has been shown to substantially reduce sexual fantasies and offending behaviors. Medroxyprogesterone acetate and gonadotropin-releasing hormone agonists (such as leuprorelin) have also been used to lower sex drive. Due to the side effects, the World Federation of Societies of Biological Psychiatry recommends that hormonal treatments only be used when there is a serious risk of sexual violence, or when other methods have failed. Surgical castration has largely been abandoned because these pharmacological alternatives are similarly effective and less invasive.

Epidemiology
Research has shown that paraphilias are rarely observed in women. However, there have been some studies on females with paraphilias. Sexual masochism has been found to be the most commonly observed paraphilia in women, with approximately 1 in 20 cases of sexual masochism being female.

Many acknowledge the scarcity of research on female paraphilias. The majority of paraphilia studies are conducted on people who have been convicted of sex crimes. Since the number of male convicted sex offenders far exceeds the number of female convicted sex offenders, research on paraphilic behavior in women is consequently lacking. Some researchers argue that an underrepresentation exists concerning pedophilia in females. Due to the low number of women in studies on pedophilia, most studies are based from "exclusively male samples". This likely underrepresentation may also be attributable to a "societal tendency to dismiss the negative impact of sexual relationships between young boys and adult women". Michele Elliott has done extensive research on child sexual abuse committed by females, publishing the book Female Sexual Abuse of Children: The Ultimate Taboo in an attempt to challenge the gender-biased discourse surrounding sex crimes. John Hunsley states that physiological limitations in the study of female sexuality must also be acknowledged when considering research on paraphilias. He states that while a man's sexual arousal can be directly measured from his erection (see penile plethysmograph), a woman's sexual arousal cannot be measured as clearly (see vaginal photoplethysmograph), and therefore research concerning female sexuality is rarely as conclusive as research on men.

Legal issues
In the United States, since 1990 a significant number of states have passed sexually violent predator laws. Following a series of landmark cases in the Supreme Court of the United States, persons diagnosed with paraphilias, particularly pedophilia (Kansas v. Hendricks, 1997) and exhibitionism (Kansas v. Crane, 2002), with a history of anti-social behavior and related criminal history (that includes at a determination of at least "some lack-of-control" by the person), can be held indefinitely in civil confinement under various state legislation generically known as sexually violent predator laws and the federal Adam Walsh Act (United States v. Comstock, 2010).

See also

 -phil- (list of philias)
 Courtship disorder
 Dorian Gray syndrome
 Erotic target location error
 Human sexuality
 List of paraphilias
 Lovemap
 Object sexuality
 Perversion
 Psychosexual development
 Sex and the law
 Sexual ethics
 Richard von Krafft-Ebing

References

Citations

General bibliography
 D. Richard Laws, William T. O'Donohue (ed.), Sexual Deviance: Theory, Assessment, and Treatment, 2nd ed., Guilford Press, 2008,

Further reading
 Kenneth Plummer, Sexual stigma: an interactionist account, Routledge, 1975, 
 Elisabeth Roudinesco, Our Dark Side, a History of Perversion, Polity Press, 2009, 
 David Morgan (psychoanalyst), Married to the Eiffel Tower. Married to the Eiffel Tower, a post on the blog Documentary Heaven.

External links 

DSM-IV and DSM-IV-TR list of paraphilias
Proposed diagnostic criteria for sex and gender section of DSM5